Shout: The True Story of a Survivor Who Refused to be Silenced is a poetic memoir by Laurie Halse Anderson, published March 12, 2019 by Viking Books. The book is a New York Times best seller.

Reception

Print book 
Shout received starred reviews from Kirkus, Booklist, BookPage, and Publishers Weekly, as well as positive reviews from New York Times, Los Angeles Times, and Common Sense Media. Kirkus, School Library Journal, Horn Book, NPR, Chicago Public Library, and Publishers Weekly named it one of the best books of the year. It's also a Junior Library Guild selection.
Kirkus Reviews stated the book was "necessary for every home, school, and public library."

Audiobook 
The audiobook also received a starred review from Booklist.

References 

American memoirs
2019 non-fiction books
Viking Press books